Competitor backlinking is a search engine optimization strategy that involves analyzing the backlinks of competing websites within a vertical search. The outcome of this activity is designed to increase organic search engine rankings and to gain an understanding of the link building strategies used by business competitors.

By analyzing the backlinks to competitor websites, it is possible to gain a benchmark on the number of links and the quality of links that is required for high search engine rankings. Another possible outcome of competitive backlinking is the identification of the type of websites that are inclined to link to a specific type of website.

Backlink tools
 Yahoo! Site Explorer
 Semrush

References

External links
 Google Search Console

Search engine optimization